Endotricha lunulata is a species of snout moth in the genus Endotricha. It was described by Wang and Li, in 2005, and is known from China (Hainan, Yunnan).

The wingspan is 12–14 mm. The forewings are pink suffused with black scales and the costal margin is irrorated with yellowish white spots. The hindwings are the same color and shape as the forewings.

Etymology
The specific name is derived from the Latin lunulatus (meaning lunular) and refers to the shape of cornutus.

References

Moths described in 2005
Endotrichini